The 2012 Beijing Guoan F.C. season was their 9th consecutive season in the Chinese Super League, established in 2004 season. They competed in the AFC Champions League and Chinese FA Cup, getting knocked out in both competitions.

Players

First team squad
As of 5 November 2012

Reserve squad

Out on loan

Transfers

Winter

In:

 
 

Out:

Summer

In:

Out:

Friendlies

Mid–season

Competitions

Chinese Super League

League table

Matches

Chinese FA Cup

AFC Champions League

Group stage

References

Beijing Guoan F.C. seasons
Beijing Guoan F.C.